Mario Fabrizio Fracassi (born 12 September 1957, in Pavia) is an Italian politician.

He is a member of Lega Nord and he served as member of the Regional Council of Lombardy from 1995 to 2000. He was elected Mayor of Pavia at the 2019 Italian local elections and took office on 30 May 2019.

See also
2019 Italian local elections
List of mayors of Pavia

References

External links
 

1957 births
Living people
Mayors of Pavia
Lega Nord politicians